Johann Christoph von Westerstetten (6 January 1563 - 28 July 1637) was Prince-bishop of Eichstätt, Bavaria, Germany, during the Thirty Years' War. He was a proponent of the Counter-Reformation.

Johann Christoph von Westerstetten was born on 6 January 1563 at Wasseralfingen.
He was ordained a Catholic priest in Augsburg, Bavaria, on 11 August 1589.
In 1603 he became provost in Ellwangen.
On 4 December 1612 he was selected Prince-bishop of Eichstätt. He was confirmed on 28 January 1613 and consecrated on 14 April 1613.

Johann Christoph von Westerstetten is well known for the large number of witch trails conducted during his authority.
 
In Ellwangen he began systematically persecuting witches and continued the witch-hunt in Eichstätt. In 1611 and 1612 about 260 witches were executed in Ellwangen. Between 1613 and 1630 at least 199 witch trails and 176 executions (150 women and 26 men) were performed in the Prince-Bishopric of Eichstätt under his government.

In 1630, King Gustavus Adolphus of Sweden landed in Germany and threatened to invade Bavaria.
In 1631, Westerstetten came to the Jesuit College of Ingolstadt, perhaps seeking the protection of Duke Maximilian.
His reason may equally have been that he was bishop of that town, and president of the University of Ingolstadt.
He never returned to Eichstätt.
He died on 28 July 1637, aged 75.

References

Citations

Sources

1563 births
1637 deaths
Roman Catholic bishops of Eichstätt